Claiborne is an unincorporated community and census-designated place (CDP) in Ouachita Parish, Louisiana, United States. The population was 9,830 at the 2000 census. It is part of the Monroe Metropolitan Statistical Area.

Geography
Claiborne is located at  (32.530235, -92.191796).

Demographics

2020 census

As of the 2020 United States census, there were 12,631 people, 4,532 households, and 2,851 families residing in the CDP.

2000 census
As of the census of 2000, there were 9,830 people, 3,759 households, and 2,823 families residing in the CDP. The racial makeup of the CDP was 97.04% White, 1.58% African American, 0.13% Native American, 0.31% Asian, 0.01% Pacific Islander, 0.23% from other races, and 0.70% from two or more races. Hispanic or Latino of any race were 1.08% of the population.

There were 3,759 households, out of which 40.2% had children under the age of 18 living with them, 59.3% were married couples living together, 12.4% had a female householder with no husband present, and 24.9% were non-families. 21.8% of all households were made up of individuals, and 8.3% had someone living alone who was 65 years of age or older. The average household size was 2.61 and the average family size was 3.05.

In the CDP, the population was spread out, with 28.4% under the age of 18, 8.9% from 18 to 24, 32.0% from 25 to 44, 20.9% from 45 to 64, and 9.8% who were 65 years of age or older. The median age was 33 years. For every 100 females, there were 88.3 males. For every 100 females age 18 and over, there were 84.4 males.

The median income for a household in the CDP was $45,200, and the median income for a family was $54,041. Males had a median income of $37,000 versus $26,008 for females. The per capita income for the CDP was $20,816. About 6.7% of families and 8.6% of the population were below the poverty line, including 9.7% of those under age 18 and 10.4% of those age 65 or over.

Claiborne is a suburb of West Monroe, and sections of the area considered part of the town of Claiborne are within the city limits of West Monroe.

References

Census-designated places in Ouachita Parish, Louisiana
Census-designated places in Louisiana
Census-designated places in Monroe, Louisiana metropolitan area